Auguste Jean Jacques Hervieu (born 1794?; active 1819–1858) was a French painter and book illustrator, working in London.

Life

Hervieu was born near Paris in about 1794 into a French family. His father was a colonel in the army of Napoleon. He studied at military school until his father's death, when he went to study art under Anne-Louis Girodet de Roussy-Trioson. He was exiled from France in 1823 for his anti-royalist politics in the time of Louis XVIII, and he moved to England. He worked in London as a painter and illustrator. As a young man trying to make his living, he travelled to America in November 1827 with the writer Frances Trollope as her children's tutor: one of the children was the novelist Anthony Trollope. He made the illustrations for Frances Trollope's 1840 book A Summer in Brittany, The Broad Arrow by Oliné Keese (1859) and others. He was married in London in 1844. 

In 1858 Hervieu exhibited at the Royal Academy. Surviving portraits include Frances Trollope, and probably Anthony or Henry Trollope as a child; the engineer James Watt; and the society cook Charles Elmé Francatelli.

Museums and galleries

 National Portrait Gallery, London (9 portraits)
 Redwood Library and Athenaeum (1 portrait)

References

1794 births
French portrait painters
French engravers
1858 deaths